Klaus Zyciora (né Bischoff; born 13 December 1961) is a German automotive designer. He served as the Head of Volkswagen Group Design from April 2020 till January 2023.

Early life
Zyciora was born on December 13, 1961 in Hamburg, Germany.

Career

Zyciora studied industrial design at Braunschweig University of Art. He graduated in 1989 and began working at Volkswagen as an automotive interior designer. His first project at the company was designing the interior of the Volkswagen Golf Mk4. He later became Exterior Designer and Concept Designer at Volkswagen before becoming Head of Interior Design in 2000 then Head of Exterior Design in 2002, before becoming Head of Design (for the Volkswagen marque) and Executive Director in 2007.

In April 2020, Zyciora was promoted to Head of Design for the Volkswagen Group as a whole, with his previous position being taken over by Jozef Kabaň.

Zyciora is the designer of all current Volkswagen ID. series production models; the ID.3, ID.4, and ID.6, as well as the ID. Buggy concept.

In December 2022, Volkswagen Group announced that Zyciora will be leaving the company and that Michael Mauer will be replacing him as the Head of Volkswagen Group Design on January 1, 2023.

Personal life
Zyciora is married to his wife Janine Zyciora, Spokesperson Design Communications at Volkswagen Group, whom he gets his surname from.

References

 

Living people
1961 births
German automobile designers
People from Hamburg